Colombia at the 1960 Summer Olympics in Rome, Italy was nation's fifth appearance at the fourteenth edition of the Summer Olympic Games. An all-male national team of 16 athletes competed in 13 events in 5 sports.

Cycling

Seven male cyclists represented Colombia in 1960.

Individual road race
 Rubén Darío Gómez
 Hernán Medina
 Ramón Hoyos
 Pablo Hurtado

Team time trial
 Rubén Darío Gómez
 Roberto Buitrago
 Pablo Hurtado
 Hernán Medina

Sprint
 Mario Vanegas

1000m time trial
 Diego Calero

Diving

Fencing

Two fencers represented Colombia in 1960.

Men's foil
 Jaime Duque
 Emilio Echeverry

Men's épée
 Jaime Duque
 Emilio Echeverry

Men's sabre
 Jaime Duque
 Emilio Echeverry

Shooting

Three shooters represented Colombia in 1960.

50 m pistol
 Noe Balvin
 Hernando Hoyos

50 m rifle, three positions
 José María Vallsera

Weightlifting

See also
Sports in Colombia

References

External links
Official Olympic Reports

Nations at the 1960 Summer Olympics
1960
1960 in Colombian sport